Thomas Lukas Fraga Fekete (born 19 September 1995 in Bern) is a Swiss footballer who currently plays as a left back for FC Chiasso on loan from Swiss Super League-side BSC Young Boys.

Club career 

Fekete is a youth exponent from BSC Young Boys. He made his Swiss Super League debut at 29 September 2013 against FC Zürich in 0-1 home defeat. He replaced Christoph Spycher at half-time. He made 2 league appearances during the 2013/14 season.

References

External links

1995 births
Living people
Swiss men's footballers
BSC Young Boys players
Swiss Super League players
Footballers from Bern
Association football fullbacks